Laura Ellen Ziskin (March 3, 1950 – June 12, 2011) was an American film producer, known as the executive producer of Pretty Woman (1990) and producer of Spider-Man (2002), Spider-Man 2 (2004), Spider-Man 3 (2007), and The Amazing Spider-Man (2012; posthumous credit). She was also the first woman to produce the Academy Awards telecast alone, producing the 74th Academy Awards (2002) and the 79th Academy Awards (2007).

Early life and education
Ziskin was born and raised in a Jewish family in the San Fernando Valley, California, the daughter of Jay Ziskin and Elaine Edelman. Her father was a psychologist and lawyer who died of prostate cancer, aged 77, on June 14, 1997.

After graduating from the USC School of Cinematic Arts in 1973, Ziskin began by writing material for game shows, then became the personal assistant of Jon Peters. Ziskin quickly became a development executive, moving into feature films with Jon Peters' production company where she worked on the remake of A Star Is Born (1976), starring Barbra Streisand. She was the associate producer of The Eyes of Laura Mars (1978).

Career

Fogwood Films and as an independent producer
Ziskin formed Fogwood Films with partner Sally Field in 1984, and produced Murphy's Romance (1985). As an independent producer, Ziskin produced the thriller No Way Out (1987) for Orion Pictures. Ziskin and partner Ian Sander produced two films featuring Dennis Quaid, the 1988 remake of D.O.A. and Taylor Hackford's Everybody's All-American (also 1988).

Touchstone Pictures
Ziskin's largest success came with the release of the comedy Pretty Woman (1990), starring Julia Roberts and Richard Gere, on which Ziskin served as executive producer for Touchstone Pictures. Ziskin's next project, What About Bob? (1991), proved stressful. She and star Bill Murray had spirited disagreements during production.

Neither  that film nor The Doctor (also 1991) were anywhere near as strong at the box-office as Pretty Woman. A switch to Columbia resulted in Stephen Frears' Hero (1992), a loose remake of Meet John Doe (1941), for which Ziskin both produced and supplied the story. Ziskin directed her first short film Oh, What a Day! 1914, which was released in 1994, and produced the Nicole Kidman tour-de-force To Die For (1995), under the banner of Laura Ziskin Productions.

Fox 2000
By the time that last film was in release, Ziskin had been appointed president of Fox 2000, one of several offshoots 20th Century Fox developed to speed up their production and distribution. Since the formation of Fox 2000, Ziskin rounded up an impressive number of directors and writers.

Among the films released were Edward Zwick's Gulf War drama Courage Under Fire (1996) and the romantic comedy One Fine Day (also 1996) and Pat O'Connor's Inventing the Abbotts (1997) and the big-budget disaster film Volcano (also 1997). Ziskin and Tom Rothman helped develop the script for The English Patient (1996) before studio head Bill Mechanic returned the rights to director Anthony Minghella, who then got it produced and distributed through Miramax.

Ziskin executive produced As Good as It Gets (1997). The film received seven Academy Award nominations, including Best Picture and three acting nods, and its stars, Jack Nicholson and Helen Hunt, took home the leading role Oscars in the acting categories.

Columbia Pictures
After nearly five years in the same job, Ziskin resigned from Fox 2000 in November 1999 and within a month had a production deal at Columbia Pictures. After being tapped to serve as the first solo female producer of an Academy Awards telecast in 2002, Ziskin returned to the big screen with the highly anticipated feature version of Spider-Man (2002). The film was released in early May to widespread acclaim from critics, went on to break box office records, and became the highest-grossing film of its year. The success of the film led to two sequels, Spider-Man 2 (2004) and Spider-Man 3 (2007). In 2002, Ziskin was also awarded the Crystal Award by Women in Film for her efforts at expanding the role of women in the entertainment industry.

Breast cancer activism
In February 2004, Ziskin was diagnosed with stage 3 breast cancer, a disease doctors had repeatedly missed previously because of the diffuse type of cancer she had.

On May 28, 2008, Ziskin, along with Katie Couric, Sherry Lansing, the Entertainment Industry Foundation, the Noreen Fraser Foundation and Ellen Ziffren, announced the creation of the charitable organization Stand Up to Cancer.

Death
Ziskin died of breast cancer at her home in Santa Monica, California, on June 12, 2011, aged 61. Her final films were the franchise reboot, The Amazing Spider-Man (2012) and The Butler (2013). She died a few weeks after principal filming ended on The Amazing Spider-Man but three weeks before filming began on The Butler. In 2012, the Athena Film Festival created an award to be given in her honor: The Laura Ziskin Lifetime Achievement Award is given annually to a woman in the film industry whose leadership demonstrates vision and courage and sets a standard for other women to emulate.

Personal life
When she was about 27, Ziskin married writer Julian Barry, relocating to Connecticut to help him raise his three children from a previous marriage. The couple later had a daughter, Julia Barry. Ziskin was married to writer Alvin Sargent from 2010 until her death in 2011 from complications of breast cancer.

Filmography as producer and executive producer
She was a producer in all films unless otherwise noted.

Film

As writer

Miscellaneous crew

Thanks

Television

As writer

Miscellaneous crew

References

External links
 
 
 
Laura Ziskin profile via Stand Up to Cancer
Lukeford.net Biography

1950 births
2011 deaths
Film producers from California
Jewish American writers
Television producers from California
American women television producers
American women in business
Deaths from cancer in California
Deaths from breast cancer
Jewish women writers
People from the San Fernando Valley
USC School of Cinematic Arts alumni
American women film producers
21st-century American Jews
21st-century American women